Offsiders is an Australian television sport program hosted by AFL commentator Kelli Underwood. The show airs live on Sunday mornings at 10:00 am on ABC TV and ABC News.

History
The show began airing in 2005 (alongside Insiders, its news/politics sister show which airs on ABC TV at 9:00 am on Sunday mornings). From 2005 until 2013, the show aired at 10:30 am. Since 2014, it has been airing at 10:00am. Episodes are normally 30 minutes in duration.

Barrie Cassidy was the inaugural host of the program and hosted from 2005 to 2013.

In 2014, Gerard Whateley was appointed as host of the program replacing Cassidy. Whateley remained as host until his resignation in January 2018.

In February 2018, Kelli Underwood was appointed as host of the program.

External links
Offsiders on ABC website

Australian sports television series
Australian Broadcasting Corporation original programming
2005 Australian television series debuts
2010s Australian television series
English-language television shows
Television shows set in Melbourne